Lakshmi is a 1953 Indian Tamil-language drama film directed by K. B. Nagabhushanam and produced by P. Kannamba. The latter stars as the female lead, with Manohar as the male lead. It was released on 19 December 1953.

Plot

Cast 
Credits adapted from song book.

Male cast
 Manohar as Chandran
 L. Narayana Rao as Kandasami
 C. V. V. Panthulu as Narayanasami
 Friend Ramasami as Shankara Iyer
 Chandra Babu as Venkatesan
 T. K. Ramachandran as Balu
 T. V. Sethuraman as Kaseem
 Duraisami as Mister Chidambaram
 Gopalachari as Police Inspector

Female cast
 Kannamba as Lakshmi
 Vanaja as Thara
 M. Saroja as Parvathi
 C. K. Saraswathi as Kanthamma
 Venu Bai as Rangamma
 Rajalakshmi as Velayi
 Kamala as Dancer

Supported by
Lakshmi, Sridevi, Shanthakumari Jayashree, and Seshakumari.

Production 
P. Kannamba, besides producing the film under her production company Sri Raja Rajeswari Films, starred as the female lead, while her husband K. B. Nagabhushanam was the director. The film was shot at Gemini Studios, and many Gemini employees like music director M. D. Parthasarathy, cinematographer P. Ellappa, audiographer P. Ranga Rao, art director M. S. Janakiram, and make-up artist Sahadeva Rao Thapkere (a cousin of Dadasaheb Phalke) worked on it. The screenplay was written by S. D. S. Yogiar, and editing was handled by N. K. Gopal.

Soundtrack 

The soundtrack was composed by M. D. Parthasarathy, and the lyrics were written by S. D. S. Yogiar.

Release and reception 
Lakshmi was released on 19 December 1953. Film historian Randor Guy said the film did not succeed commercially due to the "predictable nature of the story".

References

External links 
 

1950s Tamil-language films
1953 drama films
Indian drama films
Films scored by M. D. Parthasarathy